Anton Oleksandrovych Kukhta (born 29 June 1991) is a Ukrainian football striker who played for Ukrainian Second League club Kremin.

Club history
Anton Kukhta began his football career in Kremin-91 in Kremenchuk. He signed with FC Kremin Kremenchuk in October 2008. In August 2009 Anton left Kremin.

Career statistics

References

External links
  Profile on the FFU website

1991 births
Living people
FC Kremin Kremenchuk players
Ukrainian footballers
Association football forwards